The 1995–96 NCAA football bowl games concluded the 1995 NCAA Division I-A football season. In the first year of the Bowl Alliance era, the Alliance achieved its goal of matching the two top-ranked teams in the country in the Fiesta Bowl, designated as the Bowl Alliance national championship game for the 1995 season. Top-ranked Nebraska soundly defeated second-ranked Florida 62–24 to repeat as national champions.

A total of 18 bowl games were played from December 14 through January 2 by 36 bowl-eligible teams. This was one fewer than the 19 bowls played in 1993–94 and 1994–95, as the Freedom Bowl dissolved after 1994.

Adopted for this postseason, overtime was used for the first time in Division I-A in the Las Vegas Bowl on December 14.

Non-Bowl Alliance bowls

Bowl Alliance bowls

Notes

References